{{Infobox nobility title
| name              = Earldom of Munster 
| image             =   
| image_size        =  
| alt               =  
| caption           = Arms of FitzClarence, Earl of Munster: The royal arms of King William IV (without the escutcheon of the Arch Treasurer of the Holy Roman Empire and without the Crown of Hanover) debruised by a baton sinister azure charged with three anchors or<ref>Debrett's Peerage, 1968, p.813; Crest: On a Chapeau Gules turned up Ermine a Lion statant guardant crowned with a Ducal Coronet Or and gorged with a Collar Azure charged with three Anchors Gold. Supporters: On the dexter side a Lion guardant ducally crowned Or, and on the sinister side a Horse Argent, each gorged with a Collar Azure charged with three Anchors Gold.</ref> 
| creation_date     = 4 June 1831 
| creation          =  
| monarch           = King William IV 
| peerage           = Peerage of the United Kingdom 
| baronetage        =  
| first_holder      = George Fitzclarence 
| last_holder       = Anthony Fitzclarence 
| remainder_to      = the 1st Earl's heirs male whatsoever 
| subsidiary_titles = Viscount Fitzclarence, Baron Tewkesbury
| status            = Extinct 
| extinction_date   = 30 December 2000 
| family_seat       =  
| former_seat       =  
| motto             = Nec Temere Nec Timide  (Neither rashly nor fearfully) 
| footnotes         =  
}}

Earl of Munster was a title created twice, once in the Peerage of Ireland and once in the Peerage of the United Kingdom. The first creation came in 1789 in favour of Prince William, the third son of King George III. He was made Duke of Clarence and St Andrews at the same time. When William succeeded to the throne as King William IV in 1830 the titles merged with the crown.

The second creation came in the Peerage of the United Kingdom on 12 May 1831 for George Augustus Frederick FitzClarence, the eldest illegitimate son of William IV. He was made Viscount FitzClarence and Baron Tewkesbury  in the county of Gloucester at the same time. The viscountcy was used as a courtesy title by the heir apparent to the earldom. The titles were created with remainder to his brothers Frederick, Adolphus and Augustus.

Lord Munster's great-grandson, the fifth earl (who succeeded his uncle), was a prominent Conservative politician and held ministerial office under five prime ministers. He was succeeded by his second cousin, the sixth earl. He was the son of Brigadier General Charles FitzClarence, VC (8 May 1865 – 12 November 1914), son of Captain the Hon. George FitzClarence, third son of the first earl. On the death of his son, the seventh earl, in 2000, the titles became extinct.

Earls of Munster; first creation (1789)
see Duke of Clarence and St Andrews

Earls of Munster; second creation (1831)
George Augustus Frederick FitzClarence, 1st Earl of Munster (1794–1842)
William George FitzClarence, 2nd Earl of Munster (1824–1901)
Edward Fitz-Clarence, Viscount FitzClarence (1856–1870)
Geoffrey George Gordon FitzClarence, 3rd Earl of Munster (1859–1902)
Aubrey FitzClarence, 4th Earl of Munster (1862–1928)
Geoffrey William Richard Hugh FitzClarence, 5th Earl of Munster (1906–1975)
Edward Charles FitzClarence, 6th Earl of Munster (1899–1983)
Anthony Charles FitzClarence, 7th Earl of Munster (1926–2000)

Male line family tree

Arms

 See also 
 Duchess of Munster

Notes

 References 
 Kidd, Charles, Williamson, David (editors). Debrett's Peerage and Baronetage'' (1990 edition). New York: St Martin's Press, 1990, 
 

Extinct earldoms in the Peerage of Ireland
Extinct earldoms in the Peerage of the United Kingdom

1789 establishments in Great Britain
Noble titles created in 1789
Noble titles created in 1831
British and Irish peerages which merged in the Crown
Earls of Munster